Kaski 1 is one of three parliamentary constituencies of Kaski District in Nepal. This constituency came into existence on the Constituency Delimitation Commission (CDC) report submitted on 31 August 2017.

Incorporated areas 
Kaski 1 incorporates Rupa Rural Municipality, Madi Rural Municipality and wards 10, 12–14 and 27–32 of Pokhara Metropolitan City.

Assembly segments 
It encompasses the following Gandaki Provincial Assembly segment

 Kaski 1(A)
 Kaski 1(B)

Members of Parliament

Parliament/Constituent Assembly

Provincial Assembly

1(A)

1(B)

Election results

Election in the 2020s

2022 general election

2022 provincial election

1(A)

1(B)

Election in the 2010s

2017 legislative elections

2017 Nepalese provincial elections

1(A)

1(B)

2013 Constituent Assembly election

Election in the 2000s

2009 by-elections

2008 Constituent Assembly election

Election in the 1990s

1999 legislative elections

1994 legislative elections

1991 legislative elections

See also 

 List of parliamentary constituencies of Nepal

References

External links 

 Constituency map of Kaski

Parliamentary constituencies of Nepal
1991 establishments in Nepal
Kaski District
Constituencies established in 1991